Sahlingia is a genus of sea snails, marine gastropod mollusks in the clade Vetigastropoda.

Species
Species within the genus Sahlingia include:
 Sahlingia xandaros Warén & Bouchet, 2001

References

External links
 To World Register of Marine Species

Vetigastropoda
Monotypic gastropod genera